Guido Pella (born 17 May 1990) is an Argentine professional tennis player. In August 2019, Pella reached his career best world No. 20 in singles. In July 2019, he peaked at No. 55 in doubles.

Personal life
His father, Carlos, taught him the game at the age of five. His sister, Catalina, is also a tennis player who competes mainly in ITF tournaments. He is engaged to marry the model and entrepreneur Stephanie Demner.

In February 2020 Pella announced via his Instagram account that he would be out indefinitely after being diagnosed with Morton's neuroma.

Career

Junior career
As a junior Pella posted a 19–5 record in singles and reached as high as No. 42 in the combined world rankings in 2008. Entering as a qualifier, he reached the semifinals of the French Open boys' singles in 2008, upsetting first-seeded Bernard Tomic in the quarterfinals (and losing to Jerzy Janowicz).

2006–2011
Pella started playing Futures tournaments in 2005, winning his first at Peru F3 in July 2008 without dropping a set. In the following years, he won six further Futures titles, all of them on clay. His first Challenger final came at Guayaquil, Ecuador in November 2011, losing the match to Matteo Viola in straight sets. He finished the 2011 season ranked world no. 350 in singles and no. 501 in doubles.

2012: Grand Slam & top 100 in singles & top 200 in doubles debut
Pella started his 2012 Challenger season in March, capturing his first title in that category at the Salinas Challenger in Ecuador, with a victory over Paolo Lorenzi in the final round. The following month, he won his first doubles Challenger title at the Pereira Challenger in Colombia, partnering Martín Alund.

In May, he entered the French Open qualifying draw, losing in the first round to former world no. 2 Tommy Haas. In August, he won his first hard-court tournament at the Manta Challenger, beating Maximiliano Estévez in the final. 

In the US Open, he made it through the qualifying stage of the tournament, beating Lukáš Rosol to reach his first Grand Slam main-draw match, which he lost to Nikolay Davydenko in four sets. In September, he defeated Alex Bogomolov, Jr. and Leonardo Kirche on his way to win the Campinas Challenger in Brazil.

He cracked the top 100 for the first time after winning the 2012 ATP Challenger Tour Finals, defeating Adrian Ungur in the final round. Pella finished the year ranked world no. 97 in singles and world no. 187 in doubles, a career high and a 249-spots improvement since the beginning of the season.

2013: Grand Slam debuts at Australian & French Open and Wimbledon

Guido Pella entered the 2013 Australian Open main draw directly, but he lost in the first round to qualifier Amir Weintraub. He then competed in Viña del Mar, also losing in the first round, this time to countryman Federico Delbonis. The following week, he played at the Brasil Open, winning his first ATP World Tour-level match against sixth seed Fabio Fognini, losing then in the second round to eventual finalist David Nalbandian. At 2013 Düsseldorf, he advanced to his first ATP SF starting as a qualifier, defeating No. 10 Janko Tipsarević along the way.

2019: First title &  Major quarterfinal, top 20 in singles, top 55 in doubles
Pella reached his fourth ATP Tour final in Córdoba Open in February, but lost to compatriot Juan Ignacio Londero in three sets. Having lost each of his previous four finals, in March 2019, he won his first ATP title in 2019 Brasil Open. He defeated Christian Garin in straight sets.

At the 2019 Mutua Madrid Open he reached the semifinals of a Masters 1000 for the first time, partnering João Sousa where they lost to Dominic Thiem and Diego Schwartzman. Following this successful run, he entered the top 100 in doubles at World No. 99 on 13 May 2019. Later in June, at the 2019 French Open he also reached the semifinals in doubles for the first time in his career partnering with Schwartzman this time where they were defeated by eventual champions German duo Kevin Krawietz and Andreas Mies. As a result he reached a career-high of No. 56 in doubles on 10 June 2019.
 
At Wimbledon in July, he reached his first-ever Grand Slam singles quarterfinal by defeating former World Number 3 and 2016 Wimbledon finalist Milos Raonic in five sets from two sets down, but was then defeated by Roberto Bautista Agut.   The victory marked his third against the most-recent runners-up of Wimbledon:  He had previously defeated 2017 Wimbledon finalist Marin Čilić in the second round of 2018 Wimbledon, also from two sets down, and 2018 Wimbledon finalist Kevin Anderson in the third round of the 2019 championships. Following his successful runs at the Canada and Cincinnati Masters of third and second round respectively on his debut, he reached a career-high in singles of World No. 20 on 19 August 2019.

2020-22: Major third round, ATP Cup, Full season hiatus 
He participated in the Inaugural 2020 ATP Cup where Argentina reached the quarterfinals and also in the 2021 ATP Cup where Argentina reached second place in their group (first place was Russia) and was eliminated from reaching the semifinals knockout stage.

Seeded 22nd, Pella reached the third round at the 2020 Australian Open for the first time in his career where he lost to 12th seed Fabio Fognini. 
He announced an indefinite break due to health issues but returned to the tour after 6 months at the 2020 US Open.

At the 2021 Western & Southern Open Masters 1000 in Cincinnati he reached the third round by defeating 15th seed David Goffin, and took his revenge for the loss at the Australian Open in 2020 by defeating Fabio Fognini in the second round.

2023: Comeback 
After a year hiatus, he entered the 2023 Australian Open using a protected ranking.

Performance timelines

Only main-draw results in ATP Tour, Grand Slam tournaments, Davis Cup/ATP Cup/Laver Cup and Olympic Games are included in win–loss records.

Singles
Current through the 2021 Kremlin Cup.

Doubles

ATP career finals

Singles: 5 (1 title, 4 runner-ups)

Team competitions finals

Davis Cup: 1 (1 title)

ATP Challenger and ITF Futures finals

Singles: 26 (20 titles, 6 runner–ups)

Doubles: 24 (14 titles, 10 runner–ups)

Wins over top 10 players
Pella has a  record against players who were, at the time the match was played, ranked in the top 10.

References

External links

 Official website 
 
 
 

1990 births
Living people
Argentine male tennis players
Argentine people of Italian descent
Tennis players at the 2016 Summer Olympics
Olympic tennis players of Argentina
South American Games gold medalists for Argentina
South American Games medalists in tennis
Competitors at the 2006 South American Games
Sportspeople from Bahía Blanca
21st-century Argentine people